Maive S. H. Stokes (20 November 1866 - 3 December 1961) was an author.

Life 
Maive Stokes was born on 20 November 1866 to Whitley Stokes and Mary Bazely in Shimla, then under British India. Her grandfather is William Stokes and Margaret Stokes is her aunt. She is known for collecting and editing fairy tales heard from her man-servant and ayahs (caretakers). The book titled, Indian Fairy Tales, was published in 1879. She died in 1961 in London, United Kingdom.

References 

1866 births
1961 deaths
Indian writers by century